Athanasia Tsoumeleka (born 2 January 1982 in Preveza, Greece) is a Greek race walker, who won a gold medal at the 2004 Summer Olympics in Athens.

Until 2003 Tsoumeleka was a largely unknown athlete, and she only finished seventh at the World Championships that year. To everybody's great surprise, she won the Olympic gold medal race held in her own country ahead of Russia's Olimpiada Ivanova (silver) and Australia's Jane Saville (bronze).

In the 2008 Beijing Olympic Games, she finished 9th in 20 km walk. After the end of the Games, a urine sample she had given on 6 August tested positive for erythropoietin, when subjected to a new test for CERA. Tsoumeleka expressed doubts about the validity of the procedure, and then announced her immediate retirement from the sport. On 29 April 2009 it was announced that Tsoumeleka had tested positive for CERA in a test on a blood sample provided during the 2008 Olympics. Her "B" sample also tested positive for CERA. On 18 November 2009 the International Olympic Committee decided to disqualify Tsoumeleka from the Women's 20 km Walk event of the 2008 Olympic Games where she placed 9th.

Achievements

References

1982 births
Living people
Sportspeople from Preveza
Greek female racewalkers
Olympic athletes of Greece
Olympic gold medalists for Greece
Athletes (track and field) at the 2004 Summer Olympics
Athletes (track and field) at the 2008 Summer Olympics
Medalists at the 2004 Summer Olympics
Greek sportspeople in doping cases
Doping cases in athletics
World Athletics Championships athletes for Greece
Olympic gold medalists in athletics (track and field)